The 2022 Nagoya Grampus season was Nagoya Grampus' 5th season back in the J1 League following their relegation at the end of the 2016 season, their 29th J1 League season and 39th overall in the Japanese top flight. Nagoya Grampus participated in J1 League, the Emperor's Cup and the J. League Cup.

Season events

On 18 December 2021, Nagoya Grampus announced the signing of Léo Silva from Kashima Antlers.

On 21 December 2021, Nagoya Grampus announced the signing of Noriyoshi Sakai from Sagan Tosu. Four days later, 25 December 2021, Keiya Sento also joined Nagoya Grampus from Sagan Tosu.

On 26 December 2021, Nagoya Grampus announced the signing of Akinari Kawazura from Omiya Ardija.

On 29 December 2021, Nagoya Grampus announced the signing of Tiago Pagnussat on loan from Cerezo Osaka.

On 6 January, Nagoya Grampus announced the signing of Thales Paula from Roasso Kumamoto, with the midfielder being loan backed to Roasso Kumamoto for the 2022 season.

On 28 March, Nagoya Grampus announced the loan signing of Takuya Uchida from FC Tokyo until 31 January 2023.

On 30 June, Nagoya Grampus announced that Manabu Saitō had been sold to Suwon Samsung Bluewings.

On 1 July, Nagoya Grampus announced the signing of Naldinho from Chongqing Liangjiang Athletic.

On 7 July, Nagoya Grampus announced the loan signing of Ryota Nagaki from Shonan Bellmare until 31 January 2023, and the permanent signing of Takuya Shigehiro from Avispa Fukuoka.

On 11 July, Nagoya Grampus announced the return of Kensuke Nagai from FC Tokyo.

On 18 August, Nagoya Grampus announced that Mu Kanazaki had been sold to Oita Trinita.

On 22 November, Nagoya Grampus confirmed that Tiago Pagnussat's loan deal with the club had expired.

Squad

Transfers

In

Loans in

Out

Loans out

Friendlies

Competitions

J. League

Results summary

Results by round

Results

League table

Emperor's Cup

J. League Cup

Group stage

Knockout stage

Squad statistics

Appearances and goals

|-
|colspan="14"|Players away on loan:

|-
|colspan="14"|Players who left Nagoya Grampus during the season:

|}

Goal Scorers

Clean sheets

Disciplinary record

References

Nagoya Grampus
Nagoya Grampus seasons